The canton of Carcassonne-2 is an administrative division of the Aude department, southern France. It was created at the French canton reorganisation which came into effect in March 2015. Its seat is in Carcassonne.

It consists of the following communes:
 
Carcassonne (partly)
Cavanac
Cazilhac
Couffoulens
Leuc
Mas-des-Cours
Palaja
Verzeille
Villefloure

References

Cantons of Aude